Pterostylis angusta, commonly known as the narrow shell orchid, is a species of orchid endemic to the south-west of Western Australia. As with similar greenhoods, the flowering plants differ from those which are not flowering. The non-flowering plants have a rosette of leaves flat on the ground but the flowering plants have a single flower with leaves on the flowering spike. In this species the flower is green, white and brown with an inflated base, a narrow hood and the longest labellum of any Western Australian Pterostylis species.

Description
Pterostylis angusta is a terrestrial, perennial, deciduous, herb with an underground tuber and when not flowering, a rosette of dark bluish-green leaves lying flat on the ground. The flowers are green and white, brownish near the tip. The dorsal sepal and petals are fused, forming a hood or "galea" over the column. The base of the galea is inflated and the top is narrow with a sharply-pointed end. Flowering occurs from late May to July.

Taxonomy and naming
Pterostylis angusta was first formally described in 1971 by Alex George from a specimen collected near Mount Trio in the Stirling Range and the description was published in Nuytsia. The specific epithet (angusta) is a Latin word meaning "narrow", referring to the narrow galea.

Distribution and habitat
The narrow shell orchid grows in two disjunct areas in the Jarrah Forest biogeographic region, one between Brookton and the Stirling Range and the other between Australind and Capel. It mostly grows in woodland, often in sandy soil.

Conservation
Pterostylis angusta is listed as "not threatened" by the Government of Western Australia Department of Parks and Wildlife.

References

angusta
Endemic orchids of Australia
Orchids of Western Australia
Plants described in 1971